"She Dreams" is a song co-written by Tim Mensy and Gary Harrison. It was originally recorded by Mensy on his 1993 album This Ol' Heart (produced by James Stroud), from which it was released as the third and final single. It was also the final single release of his career. It was recorded by American country music artist Mark Chesnutt and released in July 1994 as the lead single from the album, What a Way to Live. It peaked at number 6 on the U.S. Billboard Hot Country Singles & Tracks chart and at number 7 on the Canadian RPM Country Tracks chart.

Content
The song discusses a 30-year-old housewife who dreams of her husband being more affectionate towards her.

Chart performance
"She Dreams" debuted at number 74 on the U.S. Billboard Hot Country Singles & Tracks for the week of March 6, 1993.

Mark Chesnutt version
One year later, Mark Chesnutt covered "She Dreams" on his album What a Way to Live. The song was the first release from the album, as well as his first release on the Decca Records label.

Critical reception
Mike Joyce of The Washington Post gave Chesnutt's version of the song a positive review, saying that Chesnutt "makes the most of sentimental balladry." Deborah Evans Price, of Billboard magazine reviewed the song favorably, saying that Chesnutt comes up with "one of his most fully realized vocal performances on this debut single for his new label." She goes on to say that "tasteful guitar and string arrangements help distinguish this song."

Chart performance
"She Dreams" debuted at number 64 on the U.S. Billboard Hot Country Singles & Tracks for the week of July 23, 1994.

Year-end charts

References

1993 singles
1994 singles
1993 songs
Mark Chesnutt songs
Tim Menzies songs
Songs written by Tim Menzies
Giant Records (Warner) singles
Decca Records singles
Songs written by Gary Harrison
Song recordings produced by James Stroud
Music videos directed by Steven Goldmann
Song recordings produced by Mark Wright (record producer)